Shahid Bagheri Metro Station is a station in Tehran Metro Line 2, in Iran. It is located in the junction of Resalat Expressway and Tehranpars Expressway. It is between Tehranpars Metro Station and Elm-o-Sanat University Metro Station.

This metro station has eight escalators and two elevators

References

Tehran Metro stations